The 383d Fighter Squadron is an active United States Air Force unit assigned to the 495th Fighter Group.  It is stationed at Buckley Space Force Base, Colorado, where it is an active duty associate unit of the 120th Fighter Squadron.  The squadron  was first activated in 1943.  After training in the United States, it deployed to the European Theater of Operations.  It flew combat missions until 1945, earning a Distinguished Unit Citation for its actions on 27 December 1944, defending a heavy bomber formation during a raid on Frankfurt am Main.  Following V-E Day, the squadron returned to the United States and was inactivated at Camp Kilmer, New Jersey, the port of embarkation.

History

World War II

The 383rd Fighter Squadron, organized and trained in California in 1943, was assigned to the 364th Fighter Group.  It arrived England in February 1944 and was assigned to VIII Fighter Command at RAF Honington, East Anglia.

It initially flew escort, dive-bombing, strafing and patrol missions in France, Belgium, the Netherlands and Germany. It initially operated primarily as an escort for B-17 and Consolidated B-24 Liberator heavy bombers.

It patrolled the English Channel during the D-Day Normandy landings in June 1944, and, while continuing escort operations, supported ground forces in France after the invasion by strafing and bombing locomotives, marshalling yards, bridges, barges and other targets. It switched from Lockheed P-38 Lightning aircraft to North American P-51 Mustangs in the summer of 1944, and from then until the end of the war flew many long-range missions, escorting heavy bombers that attacked oil refineries, industries and other strategic objectives in Berlin, Regensburg, Merseburg, Stuttgart, Brussels and elsewhere. It also flew air-sea rescue missions, carried out patrols, and continued to support ground forces as the battle line moved through France and into Germany.

Most squadron members transferred to other units during the late summer and fall of 1945, and its aircraft were transferred to depots in September. The 383d was inactivated at the port of embarkation, Camp Kilmer, New Jersey in November, 1945.

Active associate unit
The squadron was activated on 1 February 2016 and assigned to the 495th Fighter Group at Buckley Air Force Base, Colorado.  It is an active duty associate of the Colorado Air National Guard's 120th Fighter Squadron, flying the 120th's General Dynamics F-16 Fighting Falcons.

Lineage
 Constituted as the 383d Fighter Squadron (Twin Engine) on 25 May 1943
 Activated on  1 June 1943
 Redesignated 383d Fighter Squadron c. 28 July 1944
 Inactivated on 10 November 1945
 Activated on 1 February 2016

Assignments
 364th Fighter Group, 1 June 1943 – 10 November 1945.
 495th Fighter Group, 1 February 2016 – present

Stations
 Glendale Airport, California, 1 June 1943
 Van Nuys Army Air Field,  California, 12 August 1943
 Oxnard Flight Strip, California, c. 1 October 1943
 Santa Maria Army Air Field, California, 27 December 1943 – 14 January 1944
 RAF Honington (Sta 375), England, 10 February 1944-c. 4 November 1945
 Camp Kilmer, New Jersey, 9–10 November 1945
 Buckley Air Force Base (later Buckley Space Force Base), Colorado, 1 February 2016 – present

Aircraft
 Lockheed P-38 Lightning, 1943–1944
 North American P-51D Mustang, 1944–1945
 General Dynamics F-16 Fighting Falcon, 2021-present

References

Notes
 Explanatory notes

 Citations

Bibliography

 
 
 
 

Fighter squadrons of the United States Army Air Forces